Heliyon is a monthly peer-reviewed mega journal covering research in all areas of science, the social sciences and humanities, and the arts. It was established in 2015 and is published by Cell Press. The journal is divided into numerous sections, each with its own editorial team.

Abstracting and indexing
The journal is abstracted and indexed in:
CAB Abstracts
Current Contents/Physical, Chemical & Earth Sciences
Food Science and Technology Abstracts
Science Citation Index Expanded
Scopus and The Zoological Record.

References

External links

Multidisciplinary academic journals
Creative Commons Attribution-licensed journals
Cell Press academic journals
English-language journals
Publications established in 2015
Monthly journals